Talar դալար is a Western Armenian name for females. Its meaning is symbolic of the Evergreen Tree.  

The talar or talaar is the throne hall of the Persian monarch that is open to the public. It includes a throne carved on the rock-cut tomb of Darius at Naqsh-e Rostam, near Persepolis, and above the portico which was copied from his palace. The Talar Divan Khaneh built by Fath Ali Shah is an example of this pavilion.

Description 
In ancient times, as depicted in the sculptured facade of Darius tomb at Persepolis show, the talar had three tiers, with Atlant statues upholding each. This design typified the subject-people of the monarch.

The talar built by the Qajar dynasty as part of the Royal Palace is a spacious chamber with flat ceiling decorated with mirror panels. The walls are also decorated with mirror work called aineh-kari, which produced numerous angles and coruscations.

See also
Architecture of Iran

References

Architecture in Iran
Persian words and phrases
Iranian inventions